Joseph 'Joe' Kinyua Muriuki (born 31 January 1984), is a Kenyan actor particularly active in American cinema. He is best known for the role in the film The Fifth Estate.

Personal life
He was born on 15 December 1980 in Eastleigh, Nairobi, Kenya. He later grew up in Nairobi and attended primary and secondary school in Kasarani. After finishing school, he studied accounting at Visions Professional Institute. Meanwhile, he found a job at Aga Khan University Hospital and worked four years there.

Career
In 2008, he was invited to appear in the comedy Will You Still Love Me In The Morning, co-directed by Brian Clemens and Dennis Spooners and produced by Festival of Creative arts. Then he continued to work parallel on both theater and television, locally and internationally. His maiden international appearance came through Wikileaks film The Fifth Estate produced as a Dreamworks movie. In the film, he played a supportive role as a journalist 'John Paul Oulu'.

Filmography

References

External links
 

Living people
1980 births
People from Mombasa
21st-century Kenyan male actors
Kenyan male television actors
Kenyan male film actors